Annemie Turtelboom (born 22 November 1967) is a former Belgian minister, who is currently serving as the Belgian Member of The European Court of Auditors since 2018.

Early career 
Annemie Turtelboom graduated from the Katholieke Universiteit Leuven in 1993 with an MA in Economics, having previously obtained a Teaching Certificate from the Guardini Institute in Antwerp in 1988. She proceeded to teach economics at KU Leuven for ten years where she was appointed head teacher. Her lectures ranged from primarily marketing and statistics, to banking and insurance.

Political career
In 2003, Annemie entered the Belgian Federal Parliament as a member of Open VLD.
By 2008, she was appointed as Minister of Migration and Asylum Policy in the Leterme I Government. She became Belgium's minister of the interior in the minister of the interior on 17 July 2009, and retained that office in the Leterme II Government, which took office on 24 November 2009. In 2011, Turtelboom served as the Minister of Justice - the first woman to do so in Belgian history - following the appointment of Elio Di Rupo as new Belgian Prime Minister (2011-2014). From 25 July 2014, Turtelboom served as Flemish minister of Finance, Budget and Energy in the Bourgeois Government (2014-2019). On 29 April 2016, she resigned from her function as minister in the Flemish government,  in order to take up the position of Belgian member of the European Court of Auditors.

European Court of Auditors, 2018-
Annemie is currently the Belgian Member of the European Court of Auditors, the external auditor of the EU. Her portfolio includes audit work related to EU budget, EU public finance, policies related to EU governance, financial instruments and technical assistance in the EU. Most recently, she led audits in the area of EU-China relations and passenger rights.

References

External links

|-

1967 births
Living people
Belgian Ministers of Justice
Government ministers of Belgium
Interior ministers of Belgium
Government ministers of Flanders
KU Leuven alumni
Open Vlaamse Liberalen en Democraten politicians
People from Ninove
21st-century Belgian politicians
21st-century Belgian women politicians
Women government ministers of Belgium
Female interior ministers
Female justice ministers
European Court of Auditors